The Duckster is an in-house award given by The Walt Disney Company for a variety of reasons, including service to the company as well as to the community as a whole.  The award was first presented by Disney founder Walt Disney in 1952.

Susan Henning (Hayley Mills' body double for The Parent Trap) was presented with a Duckster by Walt Disney inscribed for "Best Unseen Performance by an Actress".

Disney storyman and director Jack Hannah at some point obtained one of the unawarded extra statues from the studio; it was auctioned in 2005 for $4,813. That same year Martha Torge's Duckster was auctioned for $5,701. In 2015 the Duckster awarded to Eddie Fisher was auctioned for $1,565.44.

In 2009 a Duckster was awarded at the D23 Expo to Jennifer Sleeper, the winner of a contest to create the official portrait of Donald Duck for his 75th birthday.

Origin of the word
"Duckster" is a combination of the words "Oscar" and "Duck" (as in Donald Duck).

List of recipients
Martha Torge
Carl Barks
Clarence Nash
Bob Karp
Al Taliaferro
Susan Henning
Herb Golden
Marvin Goldfarb
Jennifer Sleeper
Madeleline Wheeler
Max Westebbe
Eddie Fisher

See also
Mousecar

References

External links
 Photo from the October 1963 party in the Penthouse Club at the Disney Studio where Mousecars and Ducksters were presented to Disney comic strip writers and artists (left to right: Bob Karp, Walt Disney, Floyd Gottfredson, Al Taliaferro, Manuel Gonzales and Roy O. Disney)

The Walt Disney Company